Steuben Township, Indiana may refer to one of the following places:

 Steuben Township, Steuben County, Indiana
 Steuben Township, Warren County, Indiana

See also

Steuben Township (disambiguation)

Indiana township disambiguation pages